The First Kishi Cabinet is the 56th Cabinet of Japan headed by Nobusuke Kishi from February 25, 1957, to June 12, 1958.

Cabinet

Reshuffled Cabinet 
A Cabinet reshuffle took place on July 10, 1957.

References 

Cabinet of Japan
1957 establishments in Japan
Cabinets established in 1957
Cabinets disestablished in 1958